Diet of Frankfurt may refer any of the sessions of the Imperial Diet, Imperial States, or the prince-electors of the Holy Roman Empire which took place in the Imperial City of Frankfurt.

An incomplete lists of Diets of Frankfurt includes :

 Diet of Frankfurt (1147)
 Diet of Frankfurt (1196)
 Diet of Frankfurt (1338)
 Diet of Frankfurt (1379)
 Diet of Frankfurt (1439), attended by the Spanish diplomat Domingo Ram y Lanaja
 Diet of Frankfurt (1556), attended by François Hotman
 Diet of Frankfurt (1790), attended by the Italian Cardinal Bartolomeo Pacca

Frankfurt